Antier (or Hanthié) is a French surname. Notable people with the surname include:

Benjamin Antier (1787–1870), 19th-century French playwright
Marie Antier (1687–1747), French opera singer
Reine Antier (1801–83), French Roman Catholic nun

French-language surnames